Idyash-Kuskarovo (İźäş Qusqarı) is a rural locality (a village) in Gusevsky Selsoviet, Abzelilovsky District, Bashkortostan, Russia. The population was 203 as of 2010. There are 5 streets.

Geography 
Idyash-Kuskarovo is located 12 km south of Askarovo (the district's administrative centre) by road. Tal-Kuskarovo is the nearest rural locality.

References 

Rural localities in Abzelilovsky District